Bremer may refer to:

People
Bremer (surname)
Bremer Ehrler (1914–2013), American politician
Bremer (born 1997), Brazilian footballer

Places
Australia
Bremer Bay, Western Australia
Bremer Marine Park
Bremer Island
Bremer River (disambiguation)

USA
Bremer, Iowa, an unincorporated community
Bremer County, Iowa
Bremers Lake, a lake in McLeod County, Minnesota

Other uses
Bremer SV, a German football club
ATSV 1860 Bremen, a former German football club, also known as Bremer SC
The Bremer Institute of TAFE, an Australian TAFE institute
Bremer 25, an American sailboat design
Bremer Straßenbahn AG, German public transport provider
Bremer Vulkan, a German shipbuilding company
Bremer wall, used for protection by American forces in Iraq
The Report of the National Commission on Terrorism, also known as the Bremer Commission
Stadion an der Bremer Brücke, a German sports stadium

See also
 Brehmer
 Bremmer (disambiguation)
 Bremen (disambiguation)